Mike Marshall (born Michael James Marshall, July 17, 1957 in New Castle, Pennsylvania) is a bluegrass mandolinist who has collaborated with David Grisman and Darol Anger.

He grew up in Lakeland, Florida. When he was 18, he won Florida state contests on fiddle and mandolin. He considers his discovery of David Grisman's music a significant event in his life, admiring how Grisman combined jazz and Latin styles into his own form of bluegrass. After Marshall moved to California, he collaborated with Grisman on film music and soon after was invited by Grisman to join the quintet. He was a member of the David Grisman Quintet from 1985–1990, touring with Jerry Douglas, Béla Fleck, Tony Rice, Mark O'Connor, Stéphane Grappelli, and Darol Anger.

Marshall and Darol Anger collaborated often during their careers. They founded Montreux, with Barbara Higbie and Michael Manring, and the supergroup Psychograss, with Tony Trischka and Todd Phillips. Like Grisman, both groups played an eclectic style of music that combined classical, folk, jazz, and bluegrass. Marshall has performed Brazilian music with the band Choro Famoso and on his second solo album, Brazil: Duets. He released his debut solo album, Gator Strut, in 1989.

Marshall is a virtuoso on the mandolin. He plays a 1924 Gibson F-5 mandolin that was signed by Lloyd Loar. He helped start the Modern Mandolin Quartet. His wife, Caterina Lichtenberg, is a German mandolinist. He collaborated with mandolinist Chris Thile on Into the Cauldron (2003). Both he and Caterina teach online mandolin lessons through ArtistWorks.

Discography

References

External links

 Online Mandolin School with Mike Marshall r

1957 births
Living people
American mandolinists
Windham Hill Records artists
American bluegrass mandolinists
David Grisman Quintet members
Montreux (band) members
Psychograss members